Burgerim is an Israeli fast food hamburger franchise. Burgerim opened its first U.S. location in 2016 and rapidly grew to over 200 locations by 2019. In late 2019, the company began facing multiple controversies, including financial mismanagement leading to insolvency and allegations of using deceptive marketing practices to sell unprofitable franchises as quickly as possible.

History 
Donna Tuchner, an Israeli native, was studying in New York City when she came up with the idea of starting Burgerim. She returned to Israel and opened the first Burgerim in Tel Aviv in 2011. The name is a combination of "burger" and the Hebrew plural suffix "-im", reflecting the company's focus on selling smaller slider-style burgers in orders of 2-3 or more. Burgerim was subsequently purchased from Tuchner by Oren Loni, an investor who wanted to expand the franchise into the United States. Burgerim opened its first official U.S. location in California in 2016.

Menu 
The Burgerim menu consists of mini burgers that are slightly bigger than sliders. The company offers 10 different types of patties, including beef, chicken, lamb, salmon and falafel options. A wide range of toppings include American cheese to avocado and pineapple.

Controversy 
In January 2020, Restaurant Business magazine reported in a three-part series that Burgerim was considering filing bankruptcy and was facing insolvency.
According to the magazine's reporting, Burgerim CEO Oren Loni was a "salesperson" but "not a businessperson" who "could sell a ketchup popsicle to a woman in a white suit", in the words of one ex-Burgerim employee. Loni, and Burgerim salespeople under his direction, allegedly made extravagant and unrealistic promises to prospective franchisees, including "verbal assurances that they would definitely make profit" even though the vast majority of franchise locations were not profitable as of 2019. Burgerim also offered a money-back guarantee on franchisees' initial $50,000 startup fee that they paid to Burgerim, if they could not find a suitable location for the franchise within six months, but the company soon stopped paying these promised refunds as it neared insolvency.

Current and former franchisees who were interviewed claimed that Burgerim focused only on selling additional franchises as quickly as possible, and severely underrepresented the costs of building out and operating the restaurants. Many franchisees were forced to take out additional loans, mortgages, or even sell their homes, only to close their Burgerim locations months after opening due to soaring costs. Some subsequently declared personal bankruptcy or became homeless.

Since the vast majority of Burgerim franchises were unprofitable, it became difficult for the Burgerim corporate brand to collect ongoing franchise fees, which were its sole source of income aside from the initial startup fee that it collected from franchisees. Burgerim thus "operated much like a pyramid scheme", in which it was forced to open yet more and more new franchises indefinitely, in order to merely stay afloat, by collecting the initial startup fee.
As of January 2020, franchisees' calls and emails to Burgerim's corporate office and lawyers were reportedly going unanswered, though Burgerim was reportedly still soliciting for franchisees to open new locations. 

As of January 2020, Burgerim CEO Oren Loni had reportedly absconded from the USA and fled back to Israel.

In February 2022, the U.S. Attorney General filed a lawsuit against Burgerim and its founder Oren Loni in the U.S. state of California, citing breaches of the Federal Trade Commission Act. The lawsuit claims Burgerim was misleading franchisees about the viability of its business, defrauding and overselling to veterans and mostly inexperienced investors, and that it backed out of a promise to refund franchise fees to thousands of investors.

References

External links 
 

Restaurants established in 2011
Fast-food chains of the United States
2011 establishments in Israel
Restaurants in Israel